The 2011 United Football Cup was the third edition of the United Football Cup that ran from mid-October to mid-December 2011.  This edition consisted of 28 teams which were separated into seven groups with the top two teams of the group advancing to the round of 16. The two best third placed teams claimed the remaining two slots in the round of 16.

In the previous year the clubs were initially separated into four equal groups, with a single round-robin played in each to divide the groups into top-two and bottom-two clusters. The top two of every group qualified for the knock-out stage while the bottom-two clubs of each set battled for the Plate. The eight teams who made it to the knock-out stages were given the right of playing in the league first division while teams who played for the Plate proceeded to the league second division.

Philippine Air Force successfully grabbed their second title.

Group stage

All times are Philippine Standard Time (PST) – UTC+8.

Group A

Group B

Group C

Group D

Group E

Group F

Group G

Ranking of group third placed teams
The two best third place teams among all groups qualify for the knockout stage.  They are determined by the parameters in this order:
 Highest number of points
 Goal difference
 Highest number of goals scored (goals for)

Knockout stage

Round of 16

Matches were rescheduled since some players playing for the clubs were on national duty as members of the U23 National Team competing in the 2011 Southeast Asian Games in Indonesia. Games originally scheduled on November 6 at the Nomads Sports Club were postponed due to pitch conditions. Games scheduled on that day were Team Socceroo vs Kaya and Green Archers United vs Manila Lions.

On November 10, the UFL Executive Committee released the official schedule of the remaining matches on their official Facebook account. However, on November 16 the Rizal Memorial Stadium officials advised the UFL not to use the pitch in preparation for the Philippines–LA Galaxy match on December 3.

On November 22, the UFL Executive Committee has announced via their official Facebook page that the match between Loyola Meralco Sparks and Sunken Garden United FC at Nomads Sports Club is postponed due to pitch condition.

Quarter-finals

Semi-finals

Third Place

Finals

Top scorers

Awards
Agility Award:  Yanti Barsales (Philippine Air Force)
Golden Gloves:  Edmundo Mercado Jr. (Philippine Air Force)
Golden Boot:  Phil Younghusband (Loyola Meralco Sparks)
Golden Ball:  Yanti Barsales (Philippine Air Force)

Notes

References

2011 domestic association football cups
United Football League Cup seasons
Cup